LM5: The Tour Film is a 2020 concert film by British girl group Little Mix following the release of their fifth studio album LM5. The film is directed by Laurence Warder and distributed by Trafalgar Releasing. The film included performances from the final London show of the group's sixth concert tour, LM5: The Tour with special guest appearances by Stormzy and Kamille.

LM5: The Tour Film was released on 21 November 2020 in cinemas worldwide. Although screening dates for the UK & Ireland, and parts of Europe was moved to December 2020 and January 2021 respectively, due the continued impact of the COVID-19 Pandemic. It was also released on iTunes, and was aired on Sky One, a few months after its initial release.

Background 
The film is directed by Laurence Warder, with the production handled by Vicky Smith. It was filmed during the last show of the group's sixth concert tour, LM5: The Tour, on London's O2 Arena. It was distributed by Trafalgar Releasing and was produced by Sony Music UK's 4th Floor Creative. The film includes performances of "Power" and "More Than Words" where the group is joined on stage by fellow collaborators Stormzy and Kamille respectively.

Release 
On 8 October 2020, Little Mix announced on their social media that they will be releasing their first concert film along with the official poster. The official trailer for the film was uploaded to the Little Mix's official YouTube channel on 15 October 2020. Ticket for the film went on sale the same day. Screening dates for the UK and Ireland was rescheduled to 12 and 13 December 2020, while screening dates in some countries in Europe including France, Germany, and Belgium, was rescheduled to 16 and 17 January 2021 due to strict lockdown protocols caused by the COVID-19 pandemic. The film also aired on Sky One, a British pay television channel. In February 2021, the film was made available for purchase on iTunes.

Reception

The film debuted at number 3 in the UK box office during its release week with $110.4 thousand dollars grossed. It also ranked at number 10 in Mexico, number 15 in Australia, and number 21 in New Zealand. The film grossed over $161.2 thousand dollars in total in all four countries.

Tracklist

References 

2020 films
Films shot in London
Concert films
Little Mix
British documentary films
Documentary films about singers
Little Mix concert tours
2020 documentary films
2020s English-language films
2020s British films